The alpine river galaxias (Galaxias paucispondylus) is a galaxiid of the genus Galaxias, found only in mid to high altitude streams flowing from the Southern Alps of New Zealand. It grows to a length of up to 11 cm.

Alpine galaxias are speckled olive-green over a light brown base.  The single large dorsal fin is rounded, and set back two thirds of the body length, the anal fin a little further back.  The caudal fin is large and slightly forked.  Like all galaxiids it lacks scales and has a thick, leathery skin covered with mucus.

They are non-diadromous and therefore do not have a marine phase and are not part of the whitebait catch.

References
 
 NIWA June 2006

alpine galaxias
Endemic freshwater fish of New Zealand
Fish of the South Island
Taxa named by Gerald Stokell
alpine galaxias